Matiere is a rural community in the Ruapehu District and Manawatū-Whanganui region of New Zealand's North Island.

European settlers arrived in the early 1900s, establishing the Matiere School in 1906.

The settlement is now a ghost town, consisting of a small number of homes, former shops and former churches. However, there is still a small but active community.

The former post office has been converted to a business making swings for babies and toddlers. The business supplies just 35 stockists, but Kourtney Kardashian is among its customers. The couple who make the swings live in the former Catholic church, and have turned the former Methodist church into a woodworking workshop.

In September 2018, American forestry company Soper Wheeler Co received regulatory approval to convert to convert a 1148 hectare farm north of the main settlement into a redwood forest.

Education

References

Populated places in Manawatū-Whanganui
Ruapehu District